Lever is a software company headquartered in San Francisco, California and Toronto, Canada that provides an applicant tracking system for hiring. It was founded in 2012 by Nate Smith, Sarah Nahm, Randal Truong, and Brian Noguchi. It is backed by an advisory board which includes Aaron Levie, CEO of Box, Marissa Mayer, former CEO of Yahoo!, and Jeremy Stoppelman, CEO of Yelp.

Funding and History
Smith, who graduated Olin College of Engineering in 2007 and worked previously as a product manager at Google, began Lever in 2012. He spent a year building a real-time web framework, Derbyjs.com. He was accepted into Y Combinator with the goal of applying this framework to the problem of hiring talent. Smith connected with Nahm and Truong through Stanford University and Google networks. All three had previously worked at technology companies. Nahm received a BS from Stanford University and joined Google as Marissa Mayer's speechwriter. She led the growth of the Chrome browser from launch to 2011.

In September 2012, Lever raised $2.8 million in a seed round led by SV Angel. Other investors included Marissa Mayer (CEO of Yahoo!), Aaron Levie (CEO and co-founder of Box), Jeremy Stoppelman (CEO and co-founder of  Yelp), and Y Combinator.

In October 2014, Lever raised $10 million in its series A round led by Matrix Partners. Other investors included SV Angel, Redpoint, Index Ventures, Y Combinator, and Khosla general partners Keith Rabois and Ben Ling.

In 2021, Lever raised $50 million in a Series D round led by Apax Digital Fund.

In August 2022, Lever was acquired by Employ Inc. for an undisclosed sum.

As of September 2015, minorities represented 49% of Lever’s workforce. The company has a 50:50 gender ratio.

Software
Lever is an applicant tracking system.  The Lever Hire and Lever Nurture features allow customers to grow their network of potential hires. Lever Analytics allows customers to access customized reports with data visualization, completed offers, and interview feedback.

Customers
As of 2021, Lever customers included Netflix, Atlassian, KPMG, and McGraw-Hill Education.

Awards and recognition
 Named one of the "Top 100 Software Companies of 2021" by The Software Report  
 Listed as the "Overall Remote Team Hiring Platform of the Year" by RemoteTech 
 Named "AMERICA’S BEST STARTUP EMPLOYERS" by Forbes  
 Certified as a Great Place to Work by Great Place to Work

References

External links

American companies established in 2012
Privately held companies of the United States
Recruitment software
Companies based in San Francisco
Software companies based in California
Software companies of the United States